Diego Ignacio Cuéllar Vásquez (born 22 November 1986) is a Chilean footballer who currently plays for Chilean Segunda División side Lautaro de Buin.

Honours
Deportes Vallenar
 Segunda División: 2017 Transición

References

External links

Diego Cuéllar at playmakerstats.com (English version of ceroacero.es)

1986 births
Living people
People from Ovalle
Chilean footballers
Deportes Ovalle footballers
Unión La Calera footballers
San Luis de Quillota footballers
Deportes La Serena footballers
Naval de Talcahuano footballers
Deportes Vallenar footballers
Deportes Recoleta footballers
Lautaro de Buin footballers
Primera B de Chile players
Chilean Primera División players
Segunda División Profesional de Chile players
Association football forwards